The first USS Cero (SP-1189) was a United States Navy patrol vessel in commission from 1917 to 1918.

Cero was built as a private motorboat of the same name in 1915 by the Luders Marine Construction Company at Stamford, Connecticut. In mid-July 1917, the U.S. Navy ordered her to be turned over to its control for use as a section patrol boat during World War I. Her owner, R. C. McCorkle of New York City, delivered her to the Navy in August 1917, and she was placed in service as USS Cero (SP-1189).

Her entire crew was rescued uninjured.

References

Department of the Navy Naval History and Heritage Command Online Library of Selected Images: Civilian Ships: Cero (American Motor Boat, 1915). Served as USS Cero (SP-1189) in 1917–1918
NavSource Online: Section Patrol Craft Photo Archive Cero (SP 1189)

Patrol vessels of the United States Navy
World War I patrol vessels of the United States
Ships built in Stamford, Connecticut
1915 ships
Maritime incidents in 1918
World War I shipwrecks in the Atlantic Ocean
Shipwrecks of the Rhode Island coast
Ship fires